Wilkie is a surname of Scottish or German origin, which is medieval pet form of the personal name William. An alternative spelling is Wilkey, and a related German surname is Wilke. The surname Wilkie may refer to:

Alan Wilkie (born 1951), British football referee
Allan Wilkie  (1878–1970), British actor
Alex Wilkie (born 1948), British mathematician
Alexander Wilkie (1850–1928), British politician
Andrew Wilkie (born 1961), Australian politician
Andrew Wilkie (geneticist) (born 1959), at Oxford University
Andrew Wilkie (zoo director) (1853–1948), of Melbourne, Australia
Bob Wilkie (footballer), (1920-2001) Australian Rules footballer
Bob Wilkie (ice hockey) (born 1969) Canadian ice hockey player
Clare Wilkie (born 1974), British actress
David Wilkie (artist) (1785–1841), British painter
David Wilkie (ice hockey) (born 1974), American ice hockey player
David Wilkie (surgeon) (1882–1938), British surgeon
David Wilkie (swimmer) (born 1958), British swimmer
Dougie Wilkie (born 1956), Scottish footballer
Douglas Wilkie (1909–2002), Australian journalist
Elsie Wilkie (born 1922), lawn bowls competitor from New Zealand
Gordon Wilkie (born 1940), Canadian ice hockey player
Horace W. Wilkie (1917–1976), American politician
Ian Angus Wilkie (born 1960), British actor
J. Scott Wilkie, Canadian lawyer
Jack Wilkie, Scottish footballer
Jean Baptiste Wilkie (1803–1886), American Métis chief 
John Wilkie (1860–1934), American journalist and head of the Secret Service
John Wilkie (canoeist)  (born 1977), Australian slalom canoeist 
John Wilkie (footballer) (born 1947), Scottish footballer
Kim Wilkie (born 1959), Australian politician
Kyle Wilkie (born 1991), Scottish footballer
Lee Wilkie (born 1980), Scottish footballer
Lefty Wilkie (1914–1992), American baseball player
Leslie Wilkie (1878–1935), Australian artist and gallery director
Malcolm Richard Wilkey (1918–2009), American judge and diplomat
Philip Willkie (1919–1974), American businessman
Reginald Wilkie (1907–1962), British ice dancer
Rob Wilkey (born 1956), American politician
Robert Wilkie (born 1963), American lawyer
Robert J. Wilke (1914–1989), American actor
Vincent Wilkie (born 1969), German musician
Wendell Willkie (1892–1944), American lawyer and politician
William Wilkie (1721–1772), Scottish poet

See also
Willkie
Willke
Wilke
Surnames from given names

References

English-language surnames
Surnames of British Isles origin